Daniel Georgiev (born 6 November 1982) is a Bulgarian footballer who plays as a right back or defensive midfielder for Chernomorets Balchik.

Career
Georgiev started his playing career at Levski Sofia.

Between 2005 and 2006 played in Lokomotiv Plovdiv. In 2006 he played for six months as part of the CSKA Sofia team.

In January 2007, Daniel Morales was signed by CSKA Sofia from Cherno More and Georgiev was sent to Varna together with Miroslav Manolov as part of an exchange on a co-ownership deal.

On 1 May 2009 Georgiev scored three goals for 31 minutes in a match of A PFG against Belasitsa Petrich. During the season 2008-09, he earned 22 appearances playing in A PFG, scored three goals. In the Bulgarian Cup, Daniel played one match. Georgiev's second stay in Cherno More came to an end on 29 May 2017, when his contract was terminated by mutual consent.

On 14 June 2017, Georgiev joined Septemvri Sofia. He made his debut for the team on 17 July 2017 in match against Dunav Ruse. On 31 August 2017, after the appointment of new manager Nikolay Mitov, his contract was terminated by mutual consent.

On 4 September 2017, Georgiev signed with Second League club Montana until the end of the season.

Career statistics

Achievements
Bulgarian Cup finalist with Cherno More Varna: 2008
Bulgarian Cup with Cherno More Varna: 2015
Bulgarian Cup with CSKA Sofia: 2006

References

1982 births
Living people
Footballers from Sofia
Bulgarian footballers
Association football midfielders
FC Dunav Ruse players
OFC Vihren Sandanski players
FC Baltika Kaliningrad players
PFC Lokomotiv Plovdiv players
PFC CSKA Sofia players
PFC Cherno More Varna players
FC Septemvri Sofia players
FC Montana players
FC Chernomorets Balchik players
First Professional Football League (Bulgaria) players
Second Professional Football League (Bulgaria) players
Bulgarian expatriate footballers
Expatriate footballers in the Netherlands
Bulgarian expatriate sportspeople in the Netherlands
Expatriate footballers in Russia
Bulgarian expatriate sportspeople in Russia
Expatriate footballers in Turkey
Bulgarian expatriate sportspeople in Turkey